The Central District of Selseleh County is a district (bakhsh) in Selseleh County, Lorestan Province, Iran. At the 2006 census, its population was 56,618, in 11,952 families.  The District has one city: Aleshtar.  The District has four Rural Districts (dehestans): Doab Rural District, Honam Rural District, Qaleh-ye Mozaffari Rural District, and Yusefvand Rural District.

References 

Districts of Lorestan Province
Selseleh County